Warendorf is a Kreis (district) in the northern part of North Rhine-Westphalia, Germany. Neighboring districts are Steinfurt, Osnabrück (district), Gütersloh, Soest, district-free city Hamm, Coesfeld and the district-free city Münster.

History
In medieval times the region was part of the Prince-Bishopric of Münster. When it became part of the Prussian Province of Westphalia, the new government in 1816 created the districts of Warendorf and Beckum. In 1975 these two districts were merged to form today's district.

Geography
The district is located east of the city of Münster. The Ems river runs through the district from east to west. The Lippe River forms part of the southern border of the district.

Coat of arms
The coat of arms is a combination of the two coats of the precursor districts Warendorf and Beckum. The two sun roses are taken from the Warendorf coat of arms, which took it from the family coat of arms of the Vogt family in Warendorpe. The wavy line comes from the Beckum coat of arms, and symbolized the richness of water in the area, especially the Werse river. The coat of arms was granted in 1976.

Towns and municipalities

References

External links

 Official website (German)

 
Districts of North Rhine-Westphalia